Daniel McGee is an American statistician and professor emeritus of statistics at Florida State University, where he formerly chaired the department of statistics. Before joining the faculty of Florida State in 2002, he worked for the United States Public Health Service and in academic medicine. He chaired Florida State's department of statistics from 2005 to 2011 and retired from the faculty there in May 2019. He was elected a Fellow of the American Statistical Association in 1992.

References

External links
Faculty page

Living people
American statisticians
University of California, Berkeley alumni
Johns Hopkins University alumni
Florida State University faculty
Fellows of the American Statistical Association
United States Public Health Service personnel
Year of birth missing (living people)